Siler semiglaucus, the metallic jumper, colorful jumping spider, or jade jumping spider (玉翠蛛 : Chinese), is a species of spider of the genus Siler. It is found throughout India to Philippines.

References

External links
Metallic jumper photos

Salticidae
Spiders of the Indian subcontinent
Spiders of Asia
Arthropods of the Philippines
Spiders described in 1901